Korattur Aeri, or Korattur Lake, also known as Vembu Pasumai Thittu, is a lake spread over 990 acres in Korattur, Chennai, India. It is located to the north of the Chennai–Arakkonam railway line. It is one of the largest lakes in the western part of the city.

Korattur Aeri is one of a chain of three water bodies, including the Ambattur Aeri and the Madhavaram Aeri, where surplus water from one is transported to another. The water from the lake had been supplied to Chennai residents for a brief period when there was a shortage in the late 1970s. However, over the years, the lake has been contaminated with sewage and industrial effluents from surrounding areas such as Pattaravakkam, Athipet and Ambattur.

Developments
In 2013, the Water Resources Department decided to rejuvenate and beautify the lakes in Ambattur, Madhavaram and Korattur with parks and walkways. The total project costs  600 million. In 2018, the corporation identified and removed about 550 encroachments along the bank of the lake and the bund will be strengthened to a distance of 3 kilometers.

Flora and fauna
This Lake is an important wildlife refuge in northern and western parts of Chennai, together with the much larger Puzhal Lake and the like-sized Madhavaram Lake and Ambattur Lake. According to the Care Earth Trust, a city-based biodiversity research organisation, nearly 40 bird species are present in these lakes, including common tailorbird, the purple-rumped sunbird, and the migratory Asian openbill stork.

A good part of greenery and natural vegetation was present in this lake, even till the last decade. Much natural vegetation once existed in the lake and its bund. Palmyrah, date palm, umbrella thorn trees dot the bund. Inside the lake, water hyacinth is to be seen. This apart, many aquatic vegetation, water lily and wetland rushes are present in the water body.

The lake has a multitude of birds, and is a major attraction for wildlife enthusiasts. Large and rare birds like grey pelican, painted stork, Asian openbill, grey heron and large egret occur here. Other birds include divers such as little grebe, common teal, purple swamphen, common moorhen, coot, little cormorant are found. Waders include white-breasted waterhen, Indian pond heron, black-crowned night heron, cattle egret, little egret and rare ones like common snipe, black-winged stilt, chestnut bittern, black bittern and cinnamon bittern. Other rare birds include pheasant-tailed jacana, common kingfisher, white-throated kingfisher and pied kingfisher are also here.

Apart from water birds, other birdlife like black-rumped flameback, woodpecker, rose ringed parakeet, black drongo, paddyfield pipit, blue jay, golden oriole, common mynah, Eurasian hoopoe, Indian swiftlet, swallow, coppersmith barbet, Asian green bee-eater, blue-tailed bee-eater, Asian koel, Jacobin cuckoo, coucal and rufous treepie occur here. Birds of prey or raptors such as spotted owlet, black kite, shikra, black-winged kite are to be seen.

Threatened reptiles like Indian flapshell turtle, water snakes such as checkered keelback, olive keelback, striped keelback and tree snakes like Daudin's bronzeback and green vine snake and land snakes like common wolf snake, streaked kukri snake and the Oriental ratsnake are found. Even venomous ones like spectacled cobra and common krait occur here, but are rather rare. Lizards such as Oriental garden lizard and skinks like keeled Indian mabuya, bronze mabuya and Lygosoma punctata occur here. Bengal monitor is rare here and is threatened and protected species.

Amphibians like green pond frog, skittering frog, Jerdon's bullfrog, Indian bullfrog, Indian tree frog, Asian common toad, ornate narrow-mouthed frog, Microhyla rubra and Ramanella variegata occur here. All of these get very active during monsoon.

Mammals are rare here. Earlier, stray occasions of the predatory golden jackal were known. But at present, their existence is doubtful. Indian grey mongoose and Indian palm squirrel are commonly seen. The Indian pipistrelle bat is also commonly seen during late evenings.

See also

Water management in Chennai

References

Lakes of Chennai
Lakes of Tamil Nadu